Nibelungenfestspiele Worms is a theatre festival in Worms, Rheinland-Pfalz, Germany.

The performance venue is an open-air stage directly in front of Worms Cathedral (Wormser Dom). From 2003 to 2014 artistic director of the festival was  Dieter Wedel. Since 2015, producer Nico Hofmann has been the director.

History
The festival was established during the Third Reich in 1937. Between 1937 and 1939 the repertoire was based exclusively on Christian Friedrich Hebbel's 1861 three-part drama Die Nibelungen. The festival was revived in 1956 was without lasting success.

In 2002 the first new production of the Nibelungen Festival took place in order to re-establish Worms as a festival city. Theater and movie stars like Dieter Wedel, Mario Adorf and Maria Schrader were hired to cause a stir throughout Germany. Produced by Moritz Rinke, the first festival took place on the south portal of the Worms Cathedral. In the summer of 2010, for financial reasons, an improvised version of the festival titled Devil, God and Emperor - Improvisations on the Time in which the Nibelungenlied Arose was played on a smaller scale at the "Platz der Partnerschaft", incorporating the ambience near the Cathedral. In 2011 the Nibelung Festival celebrated its 10th anniversary with a big open-air performance in front of the Cathedral; in the process, the producer and director departed from the original material of the Nibelungen for the first time. The production was titled Joseph Süß Oppenheimer, called Jud Süß.

References

External links
 

Theatre festivals in Germany
Nibelung tradition
Festivals established in 1937
1937 establishments in Germany
Festivals established in 1956
1956 establishments in Germany
Festivals established in 2002
2002 establishments in Germany